Big Cove may refer to:

 Big Cove, Alabama, U.S.
 Big Cove YMCA Camp, in Nova Scotia, Canada
 Elsipogtog First Nation, a First Nation community in Canada

See also